A. C. Flora High School is a public high school located in the City of Forest Acres, South Carolina, a suburb of Columbia.  The school is one of seven high schools operated by Richland County School District One. The school was founded in 1959 to ease overcrowding and accommodate growth in the Forest Acres area, and the school was named for Abram Cline Flora, an accomplished educator who served as the district's superintendent.

Golf 
The A.C. Flora boys' golf team has won seven 3A state championships since 2001. Coach Harry Huntley, who holds the Richland Country District record for most state championship wins (eight), has coached 14 golfers who have gone off to play for college.

Baseball 
The A.C. Flora baseball team has multiple state championship and Upper State Championship wins in the past 10 years, and won the 2012 South Carolina 3A State Championship. They were ranked top 70 in the nation by MaxPreps at the end of the 2012 season. They won the 2013 International Paper Classic, a tournament held in Georgetown, SC. The A.C. Flora Baseball team has produced college players for the University of South Carolina, Clemson University, University of North Carolina, University of Tennessee, College of Charleston, University of South Carolina at Sumter, and many other schools. The Falcons won the 2014 International Paper Classic for the second year in a row and are currently ranked second nationally by Collegiate Baseball.

Basketball 
The A.C. Flora basketball team is coached by Joshua Staley, cousin of the University of South Carolina Women's basketball head coach Dawn Staley. During the 2012–13 season, they won the Region IV-AAA Championship and made it to the Upper State semifinals. In 2014, the Boys' Varsity team won its fourth State title with a 51-42 OT win against Darlington High School. In the summer of 2014, Leon Brunson stepped down as Head Coach and A.C. Flora hired Staley as head coach. The following season, Staley lead the Falcons to a second straight State Championship appearance, where they would lose to the Midland Valley Mustangs 62–56. In the 2015–2016 season, Staley would lead the Falcons again to its third straight State Championship, where they defeated defending champion Midland Valley 60–50. This would become A.C. Flora's second championship in 3 years and 5th overall for the school. As of February 2015, MaxPreps ranked A.C. Flora 3rd in the State of South Carolina.. Legendary coach Carl Williams led A.C. Flora's juggernaut boys' basketball program in the 1980s, producing state champion teams in 1981 and 1986 and a state runner-up finish in 1985.

Math team 
Under the coaching of Patrick Rybarczyk, the team has received honors at The USC Math Contest, the Furman Wylie Math Tournament, the Carolina Panthers Numbers Crunch, the Clemson Calculus Challenge, the College of Charleston Math Meet, and made up one third of the South Carolina ARML team, which won the Division B team award at Penn State and won the Site award at the UGA site.

Notable alumni

 Thomas Hollingsworth, A. C. Flora Hall of Fame
 Lee Atwater, Republican political consultant
 Joseph Charlton, former punter at South Carolina and currently is an NFL Free Agent
 Tyrone Corbin, professional basketball player and coach
 Kristin Davis, actress, Sex and the City
 Kambrell Garvin, South Carolina State Representative, District 77
 Jeffrey W. Johnson, Associate Justice of the California Court of Appeal
 Xavier McDaniel, former professional basketball player
 Allison Munn, actress
 Steven Salzberg, scientist and professor at Johns Hopkins University
 Sadie Stanley, actress
 ND Stevenson, cartoonist
 Charles Warren, professional golfer

References

Public high schools in South Carolina
Schools in Columbia, South Carolina
International Baccalaureate schools in South Carolina